is a private junior college in Sakado, Saitama, Japan. It was established in 1983 as a female-only college, and is attached to Josai University. It became coeducational from 2005.

Departments
 Department of Business management

See also 
 List of junior colleges in Japan
 Josai University

External links
  

Private universities and colleges in Japan
Japanese junior colleges
Universities and colleges in Saitama Prefecture